Adwick upon Dearne is a small village and civil parish on the A6023 road near Mexborough.

The Adwick upon Dearne civil parish covers Adwick itself and a small part of northern Mexborough. The population of the civil parish as of the 2011 census was 333.

It lies near Mexborough and is in the borough of Doncaster.

The Church of St John is a Grade II* listed building. It dates to the 12th century with later additions and alterations, notably when the chancel arch was replaced in 1910.

See also
Listed buildings in Adwick upon Dearne

References

Villages in Doncaster